Portion Control are a British electronic and industrial band from South London, formed in 1979. The original incarnation of the group existed until 1987; they reformed in 2002.

The band pioneered the use of sampling and were acclaimed for their use of the Apple II computer based Greengate DS3 sampling and sequencing system. They have been cited as an influence on Front Line Assembly, Skinny Puppy, Orbital and Nine Inch Nails.

History
Portion Control formed in 1979 with a line-up of Dean Piavani, Ian Sharp and John Whybrew.

The trio's first release, the cassette-only A Fair Portion (including Andy Wilson of the Passage on bass), was issued in 1980 by Ladelled Music, followed by three further cassettes on In Phaze Records, Gaining Momentum and  Private Illusions No 1 (both 1981) and With Mixed Emotion  (1982).

Their first full-length vinyl release, I Staggered Mentally, was released 22 November 1982 by In Phaze. The album marked the beginning of the band's underground recognition and was noted for its use of the distinctive Roland TB-303 many years before the sound became popularized by acid house and techno music. With the release in 1983 of Step Forward, the band branched into a more melodic sound, earning them a supporting role in Depeche Mode's 1984 tour.

In January 1984, Portion Control recorded a Peel Session.

In 1987, the band ended.

Solar Enemy

All three founding members reorganized in 1990 as Solar Enemy. The band released two albums on Third Mind Records and T.E.Q. Music respectively, with some songs that did some reasonable business in the clubscene at the time. Solar Enemy ceased activity in 1993.

Re-formation
Piavanni and Whybrew reformed Portion Control in 2002, and self-released their first reunion album, Wellcome, in 2004.

Influences and style
Author S. Alexander Reed, in his book Assimilate: A Critical History of Industrial Music, said that Portion Control's early sound "blends innocuously with the moodier moments of Cabaret Voltaire and Throbbing Gristle", and at times "demonstrated a gift for gritty, teethgrinding distortion, not unlike Esplendor Geometrico". The band described their early approach to music as "electropunk", with Whybrew explaining "Our background is punk--any kind of slightly hippyish notion left us cold."

Members
Current
 Dean Piavanni (1979-1987, 2002–present)
 John Whybrew (1979-1987, 2002–present)

Former
 Ian Sharp (1979-1987)
Andrew Johnson (1979-1980)

Discography as Portion Control

Studio albums
A Fair Portion cassette-only (1980, Ladelled Music)
Gaining Momentum cassette-only (1981, In Phaze Records)
Private Illusions No 1 cassette-only (1981, In Phaze Records)
With Mixed Emotion cassette-only (1982, In Phaze Records)
I Staggered Mentally (1982, In Phaze Records)
Shot in the Belly cassette-only (1983, Third Mind Records)
..Step Forward (1984, Illuminated Records)
Psycho-Bod Saves the World (1986, Dead Man's Curve)
Wellcome (2004, self-released)
Dissolve (2004, Catalyst)
Filthy White Guy (2006, self-released)
Onion Jack IV (2007, self-released)
Slug (2008, self-released)
Violently Alive (2010, Sigsaly Transmissions)
Pure Form (2012, Other Sounds)
Unrest in the Grime (2014, Minimal Maximal)
Head Buried (2020, self-released)

Singles
"Across the Fence" flexi-disc (1981, In Phaze Records)
"Raise the Pulse" 7"/12" (1982, Illuminated Records)
"Rough Justice" 12" (1984, Illuminated Records)
"Go-Talk" 12" (1984, Illuminated Records))
"The Great Divide" 7"/12" (1985, Rhythmic Records)

EPs
Dining on the Fresh cassette-only (1981, In Phaze Records)
Surface and Be Seen 12" (1982, In Phaze Records)
Hit the Pulse 12" (1983, In Phaze Records)
Purge 12" (1986, Dead Man's Curve)
Code 11 digital (2003, self-released)
Stansted 7"/CD (2005, self-released)
SEED EP1 digital (2020, self-released)
SEED EP2 digital (2021, self-released)
SEED EP3 digital (2021, self-released)

Live albums
Assault (1986, For All and None)
Live in Europe (Spain⦁UK⦁Sweden) (1987, Big Noise in Archgate)
Live Granada 1985 (2014, Wet Dreams)

Compilation albums 
Simulate Sensual (1983, In Phaze Records)
The Man Who Did Backwards Somersaults (1994, T.E.Q. Music?)
Archive (2006, self-released)
Solar Enemy vs. Portion Control (2008, Bastet Recordings)
Crop (2009, Sigsaly Transmissions)
Progress Report 1980-1983 (2010, Vinyl-on-demand)
Progress Report 1982-1986 (2015, Vinyl-on-demand)

Discography as Solar Enemy

EPs
Techno Divinity (1990)
 "Techno Divinity" – 4:00
 "Virus Buster" – 4:50
 "Dark Angel" – 4:27
 "Techno Divinity (Version Messianic)" – 3:38 (CD only)

Albums
Dirty vs Universe (1991)
 "Universe" – 3:46
 "Welcome to Hell" – 5:51
 "Inca Pisco" – 3:42
 "Burn-Up" – 4:48
 "Dark Angel" – 4:29
 "Massive Radiation" – 4:37
 "Carcajou" – 5:04
 "Trojan" – 3:43
 "Rotator" – 4:42
 "Sundown" – 5:03
 "Dirt" – 2:52
 "Ultrasound" – 3:01
 "CD3" – 3:16
 "Damnation" – 3:59
 "Certainly Mate" – 3:06
 "Gigadrive" – 5:06
 "Burn-Up P.C. Kid Ver.2" – 4:51

Proceed to Beyond (The Rape of Europa) (1993)

Compilation appearances
The Third Mind 	(1990)
Funky Alternatives Vol. 6 	(1991)
Pieces Of Mind 	(1991)
Mindfield 	(1992)
Ghafran	(1993)
Body Rapture II 	(1993)
Taste This Vol. 3 	(1995)

References

External links

Portion Control Official HQ
Portion Control Official MySpace Page
Portion Control Fansite

Musical groups from London
English electronic music groups
British industrial music groups
English new wave musical groups
Musical groups established in 1980
Musical groups disestablished in 1987
Musical groups reestablished in 2002
Third Mind Records artists
In Phaze Records artists
Cassette culture 1970s–1990s